André Cornélis may refer to:

 André Cornélis (1918 film), a 1918 French silent film
 André Cornélis (1927 film), a 1927 French silent film
The Story of André Cornélis, a novel by Paul Bourget